Arun Khurana (born 20 June 1957) is an Indian former cricketer. He played fourteen first-class matches for Delhi between 1978 and 1983.

See also
 List of Delhi cricketers

References

External links
 

1957 births
Living people
Indian cricketers
Delhi cricketers
Cricketers from Delhi